Mother Goose Rock 'n' Rhyme (also known as Shelley Duvall's Mother Goose Rock 'n' Rhyme or Shelley Duvall's Rock in Rhymeland) is a 1990 American musical television film that aired on the Disney Channel. The film stars Shelley Duvall as Little Bo Peep and Dan Gilroy as Gordon Goose, the son of Mother Goose, along with a star-studded supporting cast of actors and musicians portraying a wide range of characters, mostly of Mother Goose nursery rhyme fame.

Plot
The film deals with the events surrounding Gordon Goose and Little Bo Peep, who, while still trying to find her sheep, goes to Mother Goose's house for help, only to discover her sudden absence. Bo Peep and Gordon search Rhymeland to flush out what has happened to Mother Goose, all the while watching as many Mother Goose characters begin to mysteriously disappear.

Cast of characters
The film features an all-star cast including:
 Harry Anderson as Peter Piper
 Brian Bonsall as Michael
 Elayne Boosler as Old Mother Hubbard
 Bobby Brown as Three Blind Mice
 Shelley Duvall as Little Bo Peep
 Art Garfunkel as Georgie Porgie
 Teri Garr as Jill (of Jack and Jill)
 Dan Gilroy as Gordon Goose
 Woody Harrelson as Lou the Lamb (of Mary Had a Little Lamb)
 Debbie Harry as The Old Woman Who Lived in a Shoe
 Cyndi Lauper as Mary (of Mary Had a Little Lamb)
 David Leisure as The Newscaster/The Game Show Host
 Little Richard as Old King Cole
 Stephen Kearney and Neill Gladwin as The Crooked Man & His Dog/Happy 1 & 2
 Howie Mandel as Humpty Dumpty
 Cheech Marin as The Carnival Barker
 Van Dyke Parks as The Minister of Merriment
 Katey Sagal as Mary, Mary, Quite Contrary
 John Santucci as All the King's Men (of Humpty Dumpty)
 Garry Shandling as Jack (of Jack and Jill)
 Paul Simon as Simple Simon
 Jean Stapleton as Mother Goose
 Stray Cats (Brian Setzer, Lee Rocker, & Slim Jim Phantom) as Georgie Porgie's House Band
 Ben Vereen as Itsy Bitsy Spider
 ZZ Top (Billy Gibbons, Joe Hill, & Frank Beard) as Three Men in a Tub
 Pia Zadora as Little Miss Muffet

Special guest appearances
 Vance Colvig Jr.
 Paul Daniels
 The Del Rubio Triplets
 Warren DeMartini, Dweezil Zappa, Randy Jackson & Stephen Bray as The Metal Band, "The Dank"
 Jennifer Evans
 Seymour Heller

Changes for Rock 'N' Rhymeland (TV version) 

Several edits and changes were made to the audio, musical score, and video for the TV edit. A non-comprehensive list of some of these variations appears below:
 Parts of the film play in a different order:
 "Mary Had a Little Lamb"
 "Little Miss Muffet"
 "Jack & Jill"
 Several scenes were completely cut:
 Mary Quite Contrary complaining about her garden
 Old Mother Hubbard and her diner
 Gordon rearranging his wardrobe
 Gordon's remark about summer vacation
 Mary and her lamb disappearing after Little Bo Peep and Gordon leave
 The Old Woman in the shoe reprimanding her many children by saying, "wait till your fathers get home," implying she has had many partners.
 Introductory speech for Old King Cole
 Various music-related edits were added:
 Onscreen lyrics during the "Gordon, Won't You Come Out and Play?" dungeon metal band scene are featured with a "bouncing ball" format to follow along.
 Different musical score during the Crooked Man Chase, the Itsy Bitsy Spider scenes, the Little Miss Muffet scene, and the Cow Jumped Over the Moon scenes
 Alternative music mix for the Del Rubio Triplets opening "Hop to It"
 Alternative intro to Bobby Brown's "Three Blind Mice"
 More present and different musical score, with background music playing through most of the film as opposed to various non-musical moments in the uncut version.
 The end credits: The uncut version features an original song while the TV version features a longer version of Little Richard's "Party with the King."

References

External links
 

1990 television films
1990 films
1990s adventure films
1990s fantasy comedy films
1990s musical comedy films
American adventure comedy films
American children's comedy films
American fantasy comedy films
American musical comedy films
Films based on nursery rhymes
Peabody Award-winning broadcasts
Disney Channel original films
Films about size change
Films scored by Van Dyke Parks
1990 comedy films
1998 comedy films
1998 films
1990s English-language films
1990s American films